Al Bateen Executive Airport is a dedicated business jet international airport located  south east of the city centre of Abu Dhabi, United Arab Emirates. The airport is on the Abu Dhabi island. Other tenants include aviation assets of the UAE government.  It opened in 1970 as Abu Dhabi International Airport (not to be confused with the current Abu Dhabi International Airport) to replace the city's previous airport.

History
The airport was built in the 1960s, and in 1970, the airport was inaugurated as Abu Dhabi International Airport.

In 1982, a new airport was opened on the mainland southeast of the city to accommodate the increasing air traffic.

In 1983, Al Bateen became a military airbase, known as Bateen Air Base.

Starting on 17 August 1990, two units of the United States Air Force deployed to Al Bateen in preparation of what would ultimately become the Gulf War. The first unit deployed to Al Bateen was the 50th Tactical Airlift Squadron from Little Rock Air Force Base, Arkansas with sixteen Lockheed C-130E Hercules transport aircraft. It was joined by the 41st Electronic Combat Squadron from Davis–Monthan Air Force Base, Arizona with ultimately six Lockheed EC-130H Compass Call electronic attack aircraft, starting 26 August 1990.

The airport remained under military control until 2008, when it became a civilian airport focusing on executive jets under the name Al Bateen Executive Airport.

On December 8, 2022, the airport was the site of the Viktor Bout–Brittney Griner prisoner exchange.

Government use 
Al Bateen's tenants include a UAE Naval Aviation helicopter squadron and the Abu Dhabi Police Department air wing.

Passenger airlines and destinations
Rotana Jet operates private jet services from the airport, having moved all scheduled commercial operations to Abu Dhabi International Airport Terminal 2 in October 2014.

Solar Impulse 2, a Swiss experimental solar powered aircraft, was given its final touches here in 2015. It used the airport as the starting point for its Around the World circumnavigation attempt. The aircraft took off on 9 March 2015 and flew to nearby Oman and then onwards to India. It was also used as the landing site for the final leg from Cairo to Abu Dhabi, landing July 25, 2016.

Historical airlines and destinations

Passenger

Cargo

Depictions
The airport is depicted in a set of postage stamps issued March 1969 by Abu Dhabi.

References

Airports in the United Arab Emirates
United Arab Emirates Air Force bases
1969 establishments in the Trucial States